Amr ibn al-Layth or Amr-i Laith Saffari was the second ruler of the Saffarid dynasty of Iran from 879 to 901. He was the son of a whitesmith and the younger brother of the dynasty's founder, Ya'qub ibn al-Layth al-Saffar.

Biography 

Said to have started as a mule-driver and a mason, he later fought alongside his older brother and in 875 became governor of Herat. When Ya'qub died in Fars in 879, Amr managed to become the successor of the Saffarid throne over his brother Ali ibn al-Layth, who was the preferred choice of both Ya'qub and the army.

In 884, the Bavandid ruler Rustam I, after being repelled from Mazandaran by the Zaydi ruler Muhammad ibn Zayd, arrived to the court of Amr, and requested his aid to reclaim the Bavand throne. With the aid of Amr, Rustam was allowed to return to his domains in Mazandaran. 

The Caliph al-Mu'tadid (r. 892–902) was forced to acknowledge the reality of the Saffarids' domination in the East, and reached a modus vivendi with them, perhaps hoping, according to Hugh N. Kennedy, to harness them in a partnership analogous to that which the Tahirids had enjoyed in previous decades. Consequently, the Saffarids were recognized in their possession of Khurasan and eastern Persia as well as Fars, while the Abbasids were to exercise direct control over Jibal, Ray and Isfahan. 

The Abbasid–Saffarid partnership in Iran was most clearly expressed against the intrepid general Rafi ibn Harthama, who had made his base in Ray and posed a threat to both caliphal and Saffarid interests in the region. Al-Mu'tadid sent the Dulafid Ahmad ibn Abd al-Aziz to seize Ray from Rafi, who fled and made common cause with the Zaydis of Tabaristan in an effort to conquer Khurasan from the Saffarids. With Amr mobilizing anti-Alid sentiment against him and the expected assistance from the Zaydis failing to materialize, Rafi was defeated and killed in Khwarazm in 896. Amr, at the pinnacle of his power, sent the defeated rebel's head to Baghdad. In 897 Ray too was handed over to the Saffarids by the Abbasids, who could not manage to hold the city against Zaydi invasions.

Death 
The partnership finally collapsed after al-Mu'tadid named Amr ibn al-Layth governor of Transoxiana in 898, which was ruled by his rivals, the Samanids. Al-Mu'tadid encouraged Amr to confront the Samanids, but in the event, Amr was crushingly defeated and taken prisoner in 900. The Samanid ruler, Isma'il ibn Ahmad, sent him in chains to Baghdad, where he was executed in 902, after al-Mu'tadid's death. Al-Mu'tadid in turn conferred Amr's titles to Isma'il ibn Ahmad, but the Saffarid remnant under Tahir proved sufficiently resilient to thwart the caliphal attempts at regaining Fars and Kirman for several more years. It was not until 910 that the Abbasids managed to regain the coveted Fars province.

According to the contemporary historian al-Tabari, at his deathbed, al-Mu'tadid had ordered one of his servants, Safi al-Hurami, to execute Amr. Safi, however, did not do it. When the new Caliph, al-Muktafi, entered Baghdad, he asked the vizier, al-Qasim ibn Ubayd Allah, of Amr's whereabouts, and was overjoyed to hear that he was still alive, as the Saffarid had been generous and kind to him in the past. Fearing that the Caliph might release him, on the same day or soon after (20 or 22 April 902), the vizier sent one of his agents secretly to kill him.

References

Sources
 
 
 
 
 
 
 
 

902 deaths
9th-century Iranian people
10th-century Iranian people
9th-century rulers in Asia
10th-century rulers in Asia
Rulers of the Saffarid dynasty
Year of birth unknown
Executed heads of state
10th-century executions by the Abbasid Caliphate
Saffarid generals